4-Chlorophenol is an organic compound with the formula ClC6H4OH.  It is one of three monochlorophenol isomers.  It is a colorless or white solid that melts easily and exhibits significant solubility in water.  Its pKa is 9.14.

Preparation and reaction
It is prepared by chlorination of phenol, preferably in polar solvents, which tends to yield the 4-chloro derivative. Direct chlorination of molten phenol favors the formation of 2-chlorophenol.

It once was produced on a large scale as a precursor to hydroquinone.  It is a classic precursor, upon reaction with phthalic anhydride, to quinizarin. The commercial dye quinizarin is produced by the reaction of phthalic anhydride and 4-chlorophenol followed by hydrolysis of the chloride.

References

Chlorobenzenes
Phenols